Kürnach is a river of Bavaria, Germany. It is a right tributary of the Eschach west of Wiggensbach.

See also
List of rivers of Bavaria

References

Rivers of Bavaria
Oberallgäu
Rivers of Germany